Greenpeace Foundation is an environmental organization based in Hawaii. It was officially founded in 1976 as an independent offshoot of the Canadian Greenpeace Foundation and was the first Greenpeace in the United States. When the original Vancouver-based Greenpeace Foundation later evolved to Greenpeace International the Hawaii-based Greenpeace Foundation declined to join them, and remains an unaffiliated organisation.

According to the Hawaii Greenpeace Foundation's 1979 leader, Don White, the Hawaii group impacted public education, influenced legislation, and was active on press public relations, yet paid its members "virtually nothing in the way of salaries", making Hawaii "a real Greenpeace group."

Greenpeace Foundation (Vancouver)
The greenpeace movement grew out of the "peace" and "environmental" movements in the early 1970s. Back then, it looked likely that the planet was going to be subjected to a nuclear war. The Canadian "Don't Make a Wave" committee formed to protest US tectonic nuclear testing at Amchitka in the Aleutian Islands and later the French atmospheric testing at Mururoa in French Polynesia. The phrase "green peace" was used as a slogan to describe the ideals of those activists, who envisioned a healthy (green) and peaceful (peace) planet as a good thing. By about 1973, the phrase had been shortened to a word, Greenpeace, and an organization called "Greenpeace Foundation" was established in Vancouver, Canada. It was this ragtag group of idealists and visionaries who first did an at-sea protest of whaling in 1975 and conducted the high-profile campaign against the clubbing of baby harp seals off Newfoundland beginning in 1976.

References

External links 
 

Greenpeace
Environmental organizations based in Hawaii